Mashhadi Kandi (also Romanized as Mashhadī Kandī) is a village in Baba Jik Rural District, in the Central District of Chaldoran County, West Azerbaijan Province, Iran. At the 2006 census, its population was 81, in 16 families.

References 

Populated places in Chaldoran County